The 2009 Qatar Crown Prince Cup was the 15th edition of the cup tournament in men's football (soccer). It is played by the top-four teams of the Qatar Stars League after the end of each season.

2009 Participants

 Al-Gharrafa : Qatari League 2008–09 Champion
 Al-Sadd : Qatari League 2008–09 Runner Up
 Al-Rayyan : Qatari League 2008–09 3rd Place
 Qatar Sports Club : Qatari League 2008–09 4th Place

Bracket

Matches

Semi-finals

Final 

Qatar Crown Prince Cup
2008–09 in Qatari football